Niels Andersen (14 May 1867 – 9 October 1930) was a Danish sport shooter who competed at the 1908 Summer Olympics and the 1912 Summer Olympics.

In 1908 he finished fourth with the Danish team in the team free rifle competition and eighth in the team military rifle event. Four years later he won the bronze medal as member of the Danish team in the team free rifle competition. In the team military rifle event he finished eighth.

References

External links
profile

1867 births
1930 deaths
Danish male sport shooters
ISSF rifle shooters
Olympic shooters of Denmark
Shooters at the 1908 Summer Olympics
Shooters at the 1912 Summer Olympics
Olympic bronze medalists for Denmark
Olympic medalists in shooting
Medalists at the 1912 Summer Olympics